Priscillah Umutashya Ruzibuka (born 1991) is a Rwandan female entrepreneur who founded Ki-pepeo Kids Clothing, a social enterprise with the aim to help underprivileged women.

Background 
Priscillah Ruzibuka is the third child in a catholic Christian family. She is passionate about women empowerment and creating sustainable employment. She was born in Rwanda while her family relocated to the neighboring country, Tanzania, and returned to Rwanda after.

Education 
Priscillah holds a Bachelor of Science in Information Technology Engineering from Multimedia University in Malaysia and a master's degree in Project management from Oklahoma Christian University located in the USA.

Career 
Priscillah Ruzibuka worked in the private sector as an employee for two years and has worked in various projects for different institutions and organizations before stepping towards being her own boss in January 2016. She currently works with former female street vendors, former housemaids and other women form underprivileged communities to help them through her social enterprise, Ki-pepeo Kids Clothing. Ruzibuka trains the women in tailoring and lets them profit from the sale of the clothes by paying fair salaries.

Inspiration 
She has been inspired by their former housemaid who got a little help of tailoring training from Ruzibuka's mother and now she has become a big and known entrepreneur in Tanzania.

Ruzibuka believes that many women are still in poverty not because they don't have the capacity to work, but because they didn't get the education and materials they needed. Some lack simple tailoring machines, others don't have the capital to start small businesses. This is the reason behind the name Ki-pepeo (a Kiswahili word meaning "butterfly" in English), referring to the process of transformation from an rather unattractive caterpillar to a beautiful butterfly.

Grants and awards 
Startup grant of $800 from Akili Dada programs
Africa Business Idea Cup: Best business idea award
5th place at the East Africa Regional Competition
Participant in the Business and Entrepreneurship Track of YALI Regional Leadership Center East Africa
Pollination Project grant of $1000
Fund of $10,000 from the United States African Development Foundation
Queens Young Leaders 2018 winner

Role models 
Priscillahs biggest role model is her mother. She describes her as an exceptional leader, parent, friend and citizen and especially admires her work-life balance. Strive Masiyiwam, a London-based Zimbabwe businessman, entrepreneur and philanthropist has been an role model for Priscillah, as he has been able to build his dreams in sustainable businesses and his passion for giving back to the youth of Africa. Paul Kagame, the president of Rwanda, is also a role model to Priscillah because through consistency and perseverance, he has been able to build Rwanda to where it is today from the starting point.

References 

Living people
Rwandan women
1991 births